Dragica Đurić, (former Krstić, ; born 26 March 1963 in Šabac, FPR Yugoslavia) is a former Serbian-Yugoslav handball player who played for the Yugoslavia national team and the Serbia and Montenegro national team.

She has been the head coach of the Serbia women's national team since February 2016. Before that, she was the coach of the goalkeepers in the national team, and the manager of the Serbia women's national team.

Đurić was a member of the Yugoslavia national team which won the gold medal at the 1984 Summer Olympics. She played one match as goalkeeper. Four years later, she was part of the Yugoslav team which finished fourth at the 1988 Summer Olympics. She played all five matches as goalkeeper.

References

External links
profile

1963 births
Living people
Yugoslav female handball players
Serbian female handball players
Handball players at the 1984 Summer Olympics
Handball players at the 1988 Summer Olympics
Olympic handball players of Yugoslavia
Olympic gold medalists for Yugoslavia
Sportspeople from Šabac
Olympic medalists in handball
Medalists at the 1984 Summer Olympics